Valto Edvard Käkelä (19 April 1908, Lappee – 30 January 1977) was a Finnish politician.

Career
He served as Minister of the Interior from 30 September 1955 to 3 March 1956 and as Deputy Minister of Finance from 15 July 1970 to 28 October 1971. He was a Member of the Parliament of Finland from 1945 to 1972, representing the Social Democratic Party of Finland (SDP).

References

1908 births
1977 deaths
People from Lappeenranta
People from Viipuri Province (Grand Duchy of Finland)
Social Democratic Party of Finland politicians
Government ministers of Finland
Members of the Parliament of Finland (1945–48)
Members of the Parliament of Finland (1948–51)
Members of the Parliament of Finland (1951–54)
Members of the Parliament of Finland (1954–58)
Members of the Parliament of Finland (1958–62)
Members of the Parliament of Finland (1962–66)
Members of the Parliament of Finland (1966–70)
Members of the Parliament of Finland (1970–72)